Uralsky is an urban locality (a work settlement) in Nytvensky District of Perm Krai, Russia, located on the right bank of the Kama River. Population:

Economy
There is a plywood mill in Uralsky.

References

Urban-type settlements in Perm Krai
Monotowns in Russia

